All-Union Young Guard Bolsheviks (ВМГБ) is the youth wing of the All-Union Communist Party Bolsheviks, which operates throughout the former Soviet Union.

ВМГБ was founded in 1992. It publishes Революции (Revolusii).

External links
ВМГБ website

1992 establishments in Russia
Youth wings of communist parties
Youth wings of political parties in Russia
Youth wings of political parties in Ukraine
Youth organizations established in 1992